Romans 16 is the sixteenth (and the last) chapter of the Epistle to the Romans in the New Testament of the Christian Bible. It is authored by Paul the Apostle, while Paul was in Corinth in the mid-50s AD, with the help of a secretary (amanuensis), Tertius, who adds his own greeting in Romans 16:22. Chapter 16 contains Paul's personal recommendation, personal greetings, final admonition, grace, greetings from companions, identification of writer/amanuensis and blessing. The chapter is divided into 27 verses.

Textual witnesses
The original text was written in Koine Greek. Some early manuscripts containing the text of this chapter are:
Papyrus 46 (175-225; complete with minor lacunae at bottom of leaves)
Papyrus 118 (3rd century; extant verses 1, 4–7, 11–12)
Codex Vaticanus (325–350)
Codex Sinaiticus (330–360)
Codex Alexandrinus (400–440)
Codex Ephraemi Rescriptus (~450; complete)
Papyrus 61 (7th century; extant verses 23–27)

Phoebe (16:1–2)

"Phoebe" is described as a "servant" of the church in the New King James Version, as a "deacon" in the New International Version and the New Revised Standard Version, a "deaconess" in the Revised Standard Version and the Jerusalem Bible, and a "leader" in the Contemporary English Version. According to the contemporary idiom in The Message, she was "a key representative of the church at Cenchreae" (or Cenchrea). The Jerusalem Bible suggests she was "probably the bearer of the letter"  and verse 2 suggests she also had other "business" to deal with in Rome.

Priscilla and Aquila (16:3–4)

"Priscilla" is a diminutive and affectionate name for 'Prisca'. She and her husband, Aquila, were expelled from Rome as Jews under Claudius, and had been converted at Corinth by Paul (Acts 18:1). Priscilla was remarkably mentioned first, perhaps inferring that she was "the more active and conspicuous of the two" as also in Acts 18:18 and 2 Timothy 4:19; except in 1 Corinthians 16:19, where they send greetings, her husband takes precedence.

Afterwards this married couple appear in Paul's company at Ephesus (Acts 18:18; Acts 18:26; 1 Corinthians 16:19). When this Epistle was written they were at Rome, but later they seem to have returned to Ephesus (2 Timothy 4:19).

"Aquila" was a Jew of Pontus. There is another Jew named Aquila from Pontus (Sinope), living more than a century later, who made a translation of the Hebrew Bible (Old Testament) into Greek, critically compared with the LXX in the Hexapla of Origen.

Andronicus and Junia (16:7)

"Andronicus" was a kinsman of Paul and a fellow prisoner at some time, particularly well known among the apostles, who had become a follower of Jesus Christ before Paul's conversion on the road to Damascus, and whom Paul commended together with Junia as being remarkable Christian workers and "apostles" alongside Silas, Timothy, and others given that title in the early Church.
Craig Hill states that no example has been found for the masculine form 'Junias', while the feminine form of 'Junia' is "very well attested", so the rendering to 'Junias' in some Bible versions is a "scandalous mistranslation".

Tertius (16:22)

"Tertius" was an amanuensis of the apostle, who wrote this letter, either from the apostle's notes, or from dictation. His name is a Latin one, and perhaps the person might be a Roman, for the names Secundus, Tertius, Quartus, Quintus, etc. were common with the Romans, although it could be argued that this man was the same with Silas, which Hebrew word is the same as Tertius. Silas is known as a companion of apostle Paul, also is numbered among the seventy disciples, and said to be bishop of Iconium (see Luke 10:1). The phrase "in the Lord" could be connected with "wrote this epistle" and make the sense that Tertius wrote this epistle for the Lord's sake (not by inspiration, but being only scribe to the apostle). However, that phrase is better connected with the word "salute" and the sense is that his salutation was meant to wish the people well in the Lord, so that "they might have much communion with him".

Gaius, Erastus and Quartus (16:23)

"Erastus": also known as "Erastus of Paneas", was a steward in Corinth, a political office of high civic status. The word is defined as "the manager of household or of household affairs" or, in this context, "treasurer"; the King James Version uses the translation "chamberlain", while the New International Version uses "director of public works". An inscription mentioning an Erastus was found in 1929 near a paved area northeast of the theater of Corinth, dated to the mid-first century and reads "Erastus in return for his aedileship paved it at his own expense." Some New Testament scholars have identified this aedile Erastus with the Erastus mentioned in the Epistle to the Romans but this is disputed by others.
"Quartus": the description "a brother" is interpreted by most scholars as "a fellow believer", rather than 'a brother of Erastus'. According to church tradition, he is known as "Quartus of Berytus", a bishop of Beirut (around AD 50) and one of the seventy disciples.

Doxology (16:27)

Paul's doxology in the conclusion of the epistle, aside from effectively summing up some of the key themes, gives a high note of ascription of glory to "the only wise God".

See also 
 Cenchrea
 Herodion of Patras
 Rufus
 Related Bible parts: Mark 15, Acts 18

References

Sources

External links
 King James Bible - Wikisource
English Translation with Parallel Latin Vulgate
Online Bible at GospelHall.org (ESV, KJV, Darby, American Standard Version, Bible in Basic English)
Multiple bible versions at Bible Gateway (NKJV, NIV, NRSV etc.)

16